English High School (Turkish: Beyoğlu Anadolu Lisesi), is one of the most prestigious and selective high schools in Turkey. The school is also one of the oldest foreign high schools in Turkey.

High schools in Istanbul
Beyoğlu
Anatolian High Schools

tr:Beyoğlu Anadolu Lisesi